Andreas Maislinger (born 26 February 1955 in St. Georgen near Salzburg, Austria) is an Austrian historian and political scientist and founder and chairman of the Austrian Service Abroad, including the Gedenkdienst, the Austrian Social Service and the Austrian Peace Service. He also is the founder of the Austrian Holocaust Memorial Award, the Braunau Contemporary History Days and the inventor of the idea of the House of Responsibility regarding the birthplace of Adolf Hitler.

Studying and learning 
Maislinger studied law and political science in Salzburg and political science and eastern-European history in Vienna, with study visits in, amongst others, Frankfurt am Main and Innsbruck. During his studies in Salzburg, Maislinger advocated for Austrian participation in the International Youth Meeting Center in Oświęcim/Auschwitz; Austrian president Rudolf Kirchschläger declined. Kirchschläger later acknowledged the value of Maislinger's proposal of civilian service for reconciliation and atonement related to the Holocaust.

In 1980 he received his doctorate for a dissertation on the problems of Austrian defence policy. He subsequently held posts at the Institute for Political Science at the University of Innsbruck, the University of New Orleans as visiting assistant professor, the Humboldt University of Berlin for a research visit, and the Hebrew University of Jerusalem.

In 1982 he co-founded the working group of independent peace initiatives of Austria and in 1986 he became a member of the founding committee of the Austrian-Israeli society Tirol. Until 1996, he published columns in the "Jüdische Rundschau" (Jewish Review).

Austrian Gedenkdienst 
Together with Andreas Hörtnagl, Maislinger founded the Gedenkdienst (Austrian Holocaust Memorial Service). He successfully pleaded for the legal establishment of this kind of alternative to mandatory military service, aiming at promoting education and raising awareness about the Holocaust.

On September 1, 1992 the first young Austrian started his Gedenkdienst at the Museum Auschwitz-Birkenau. Since then more the 1000 Gedenkdiener served in 23 countries worldwide. Prominent supporters of this program include Simon Wiesenthal, Teddy Kollek, Ari Rath and Gerhard Röthler.

In 1998 he founded the Austrian Service Abroad with Andreas Hörtnagl and Michael Prochazka, adding the Austrian Social Service and the Austrian Peace Service to the portfolio.

In October and November 2009 Andreas Maislinger made a 3-week lecturing and promotion tour through Canada and the United States.

House of Responsibility (HRB) 

As a reaction to the participation of the FPÖ (Austrian Freedom Party) in the Austrian federal government in 2000, Maislinger suggested that the city of Braunau am Inn should establish a "House of Responsibility" in the birth house of Adolf Hitler.

Further activities 

Since 1992, Maislinger has served as the scientific director of the annual Braunau Contemporary History Days in Braunau am Inn.

He also participates actively in projects promoting gifted children.

Since 2003 he is in charge of the Georg Rendl Symposion. He had founded the symposium to familiarise people with the life and works of the painter and author Georg Rendl, whom Maislinger had already met as a child in his hometown St. Georgen/Salzburg.

In 2006 he initiated the Austrian Holocaust Memorial Award, rewarding people who actively contribute to the remembrance of the Holocaust.

Awards

In 2005 Maislinger received the Decoration of Honour in Silver for Services to the Republic of Austria from the president of Austria, Heinz Fischer, and the Medal of Merit of the state of Tirol from Herwig van Staa and Luis Durnwalder.

On 8 November 2009 Andreas Maislinger was awarded with a Lifetime Achievement Award for "his 10 year fight to obtain official recognition of alternative, philanthropic service" at the Annual Dinner of the Los Angeles Museum of the Holocaust together with Holocaust survivor and producer of Schindler's List Branko Lustig.

On October 2 2012 Andreas Maislinger was awarded the Ordre national du Mérite issued by the president of France Nicolas Sarkozy in the French embassy in Vienna.

Publications
(Selection)

"Friedensbewegung in einem neutralen Land. Zur neuen Friedensbewegung in Österreich. (Peace movement in a neutral country. Related to the new peace movement in Austria.) In: Medienmacht im Nord-Süd-Konflikt". (The power of media in the north – south conflict.) Suhrkamp, Frankfurt am Main 1984 
"'Neue' Österreichische Friedensbewegung". ("New“ Austrian Peace Movement.) In: Österreichisches Jahrbuch für Politik 1983. (Austrian Annual for Politics 1983.) Vienna, 1984
"Das katholisch-konservative Lager". (The catholic – conservative side.) In: Widerstand und Verfolgung in Tirol 1934–1945, Band 2. ÖBV, (Resistance and Persecution in Tirol 1934–1945, Band 2. Austrian book publisher), Vienna 1984 
"'Den Nationalsozialisten in die Hände getrieben'. Zur Geschichtspolitik der SPÖ von 1970 bis 2000". ("Drifted into the National Socialists Hands“. Related to the history politics of the Socialists in Austria from 1970 to 2000.) In: Europäische Rundschau, (European review), number 3/2001

Publishing
Costa Rica. Politik, Gesellschaft und Kultur eines Staates mit ständiger aktiver und unbewaffneter Neutralität. (Costa Rica, Politics, Society and Culture of a State with Continuous Active and Unarmed Neutrality.) Inn-Verlag, Innsbruck 1986 
Der Putsch von Lamprechtshausen. Zeugen des Juli 1934 berichten. (The Putsch of Lamprechtshausen. Report of Witness to July, 1934), Self - published, Innsbruck 1992

See also 
 Austrian Holocaust Memorial Award
 Austrian Holocaust Memorial Service
 Austrian Service Abroad
 Braunau Contemporary History Days
 House of Responsibility

References

External links 
 Embassy of Austria, Washington D.C.: Other Famous Austrians
 CV of Gedenkdienst Founder Andreas Maislinger (Kleinmann Family Foundation)
 Homepage of Austrian Service Abroad
 Homepage of Austrian Holocaust Memorial Service
 Homepage of Austrian Holocaust Memorial Service
 Maislinger page at OCLC
 CLIO Catalogue Columbia University New York, books
  CLIO Catalogue Columbia University New York, articles

1955 births
Living people
People from Salzburg-Umgebung District
People from Braunau am Inn District
Austrian political scientists
20th-century Austrian historians
Historians of Nazism
International relations scholars
Austrian Christian pacifists
Knights of the Ordre national du Mérite
Recipients of the Decoration of Honour for Services to the Republic of Austria
Austrian Roman Catholics
University of New Orleans faculty
Austrian anti-war activists
Free University of Berlin alumni
University of Innsbruck alumni
Austrian activists
University of Salzburg alumni
University of Vienna alumni
Academic staff of the University of Innsbruck
Marietta and Friedrich Torberg Medal recipients
21st-century Austrian historians